Duler Stadium is a football stadium located in Mapusa, Goa, India. It is the former home of local I-League clubs who participated in the highest level of football in the country. Dempo SC, Salgaocar FC, and Sporting Clube de Goa use the venue for most of their home games. It also serves as home ground for other Goa Professional League clubs such as Vasco.

History

Kingfisher name sponsor rejection
In 2009 the Goa Football Association agreed to a deal with giants Kingfisher to rename the Duler Stadium to the Kingfisher Stadium but in January 2009 the people of Mapusa started to reject a rename because despite the stadium being owned by the GFA the land the stadium is on belongs to the Mapusa Communidade.

Renovation
In 2012 the Goa Football Association approved to revamp the Duler Stadium by adding a new AstroTurf to the stadium, the second stadium to get Astroturf since 2006. On 10 June 2012 it was announced that FIFA had officially approved the move for the new Astroturf. The stadium getting the grant for the Astroturf from FIFA meant that the stadium was part of FIFA's Win in India with India program.

References

Sports venues in Goa
Football venues in Goa
Buildings and structures in Mapusa
Year of establishment missing